This is a  list of firearm cartridges which have bullets in the  caliber range.

Length refers to the empty cartridge case length
OAL refers to the overall length of the loaded cartridge

All measurements are in mm (in)

Pistol cartridges

Revolver cartridges

Rifle cartridges

See also
.32 caliber

References

Pistol and rifle cartridges
!